The Marcelino Serna Port of Entry (formerly the Tornillo Port of Entry) is a crossing of the United States–Mexico border. It opened on November 17, 2014, replacing the nearby Fabens Port of Entry. The U.S. Customs and Border Protection (CBP) facility at the crossing served as the site for the Tornillo tent city, which housed as many as 2,800 detained migrant youths from June 2018 to January 2019. , a 2,500-bed holding facility for adult migrants is under construction at the site.

History 
Construction of the Port of Entry began in July 2011, and the facilities were ready at the end of 2013. However, the Mexican side of the crossing suffered delays due to lack of funding; construction on the Mexican side of the new bridge finally began in January 2014, with customs inspection facilities and road infrastructure still pending.

The port was renamed the Marcelino Serna Port of Entry in April 2017. Marcelino Serna was an undocumented Mexican immigrant who later became one of the most decorated Texan veterans of World War I.

Detention facilities

Tornillo youth detention facility, 2018–2019 
Tornillo tent city was built within the facilities in June 2018 to house immigrant children. It was operated by BCFS on behalf of the Department of Health and Human Services' Office of Refugee Resettlement. Nearly 6,200 minors cycled through the facility within the seven months it operated.

Tornillo adult detention facility 
In July 2019, U.S. Customs and Border Protection began construction on a new holding facility designed to hold 2,500 adult immigrants on the site. CBP expects the facility, which will be a "large, soft-sided structure" to begin operations in July or August 2019. On July 17, the deployment of 1,000 Texas National Guard troops to the Tornillo and Donna detention facilities was announced.

References

See also 
 List of Mexico–United States border crossings
 Unaccompanied Alien Children

Mexico–United States border crossings
2014 establishments in Texas
Buildings and structures completed in 2014
Buildings and structures in El Paso County, Texas